Falcatula cymatodes is a moth of the family Sphingidae. It is known from lowland forests in Ivory Coast, Ghana, Nigeria, Cameroon, Gabon, Uganda and the Central African Republic.

The length of the forewings is 28–32 mm for males and 34–38 mm for females. The forewings of the male are very falcate with a slightly crenulated outer margin and a sharply angled tornus. The forewing and hindwing upperside ground colour is of a similar olive-grey colour. The forewing upperside has indistinct narrow wavy transverse lines, a very small dark discal spot and a very prominent basal spot. The hindwing upperside has diffuse and indistinct postmedian and submarginal bands that are most obvious near the strongly angled tornus. The forewing upperside ground colour for females is darker with stronger transverse lines.

Subspecies
Falcatula cymatodes cymatodes
Falcatula cymatodes lemairei Darge, 1973 (Cameroon)

References

Smerinthini
Moths described in 1912
Insects of Cameroon
Insects of West Africa
Insects of Uganda
Fauna of the Central African Republic
Fauna of Gabon
Moths of Africa